China Film Stellar is a Chinese movie theater chain.

References

Cinema chains in China